Inachorium or Ina Chorion was a city in the western part of ancient Crete.

The site of Inachorium is tentatively located near modern Vathi (formerly Kouneni).

References

Populated places in ancient Crete
Former populated places in Greece